Robin Clegg (born August 11, 1977) is Canadian former biathlete.

Born in Edmonton, Alberta, Clegg lives in Canmore, Alberta.  He was a gold medalist at the 2005 North American Championships.

He retired after the 2009–10 season.

Robin Clegg was inducted into the NWT Sport Hall of Fame in 2014.

References

External links
CBC Bio

1977 births
Living people
Biathletes at the 2002 Winter Olympics
Biathletes at the 2006 Winter Olympics
Biathletes at the 2010 Winter Olympics
Canadian male biathletes
Olympic biathletes of Canada
Sportspeople from Edmonton